Jasień is a dzielnica of the city of Gdańsk, Poland, located in the southern part of the city, established in 2011.

Location 
From the north, the quarter is bordered by the districts of Matarnia, Brętowo and Piecki-Migowo, from the east by Ujeścisko-Łostowice, from the south by the rural Gmina Kolbudy and from the west by the district of Kokoszki.

History 
The settlement was first mentioned in 1284 as Gnanowo and from 1615 on as Nenkaw/Nenkau. In 1284 it was granted by Duke Mestwin II to a knight named Piotr. It was part of the fragmented Kingdom of Poland until 1308, when it was annexed by the Teutonic Knights. In 1454 King Casimir IV Jagiellon re-incorporated the region to the Kingdom of Poland, and after the subsequent Thirteen Years' War in 1466 the Teutonic Knights renounced their claims to the region. Afterwards the settlement was a royal village of the Polish Crown, administratively located in the Gdańsk County in the Pomeranian Voivodeship. From 1648 on it belonged to the royal properties of Kiełpino. It was annexed by Prussia in the First Partition of Poland in 1772, and from 1807 it was part of the Napoleonic Free City of Danzig. In 1869 it had 270 inhabitants; in 1871 there was a manor and 23 farms, with 261 inhabitants. In 1874, Nenkau was included incorporated into the Kelpin court district. In 1880 Nenkau was inhabited by 270 people and there were taverns, brickyards and 20 farms. In 1891, Nenkau manor was owned by Edward Maquet, the farmland amounted to 440 ha, a brickyard operated. After World War I Nenkau became part of the Free City of Danzig, 199 (1923) and 210 (1924) people lived here. A farm with a manor house and a park, a forge, a school and a slaughterhouse existed.

After World War II, when the area became again part of Poland, the name was changed to Nenkowo and in 1954, the village adopted its current name, which refers to the name of a former owner, F.J. Jasieński.

The area came to the city of Gdańsk on January 1, 1973. From 1992 to 2010 it was part of the district Chełm i Gdańsk Południe. In 2011 the former settlements of Kiełpinek, Rębowo and Szadółki were incorporated. Jasień gained district status in 2013. The Jasień Reservoir was created in 2014. Gdańsk Jasień railway station on the Gdańsk Wrzeszcz–Gdańsk Osowa railway was opened in September 2015. Gdańsk Lech Wałęsa Airport is only four stops and 7.2 km away.

References

External links 

 Podział administracyjny Gdańska (Polish) 
 gedanopedia.pl: Jasień (Polish)
 gedanopedia.pl: Chełm (Polish)

Districts of Gdańsk